Robert Billings (1949 – 1986) was a Canadian poet and editor.

Biography

Robert Billings was born in Niagara Falls, Ontario and raised in Fort Erie.. He held two master's degrees in English from Queen's University and the University of Windsor. Billings became well known in Canadian literary circles as a poet, critic, teacher,  and editor of Poetry Canada Review and Poetry Toronto. His poems and reviews of Canadian poetry have appeared widely in Canada, Britain, and the United States.

Suffering from depression after the breakdown of his marriage, Billings committed suicide at Niagara Falls in November of 1986. Efforts to find the body were halted once Horseshoe Falls froze over, and the ice melted before his body was recovered six months later in June.

Literary activities

During the 1980s Robert Billings was editor for literary magazines such as Quarry, Poetry Windsor, Poesie, Poetry Canada Review and Waves. He was also very active as a poet.

Published works

 blue negatives Fiddlehead Poetry Books #212 Fred Cogswell 
 The Elizabeth Trinities Penumbra Press, 1980
 The Revels,  Porcupine's Quil Inc., 1987

External links
 Penumbra Press

1949 births
1986 deaths
20th-century Canadian poets
20th-century Canadian male writers
Canadian male poets